Luis Amado-Blanco Fernandez  (April 4, 1903 – March 9, 1975) was a distinguished journalist and Ambassador from Cuba to Portugal and then to the Holy See from 1961–1975.

Biography
Fernandez was born in Riberas de Pravia, Asturias, Spain.  He initially travelled to Cuba as a correspondent for El Heraldo de Madrid to report on the fall of Gerardo Machado.  He permanently moved in 1936 and lead an active cultural life.  He received and the Talia Prize for his direction  of  La Dama de Alba by Alejandro Casona as well as the Justo de Lara Prize.  In 1951, he received the Premio Nacional for the story Sola.  Among his more famous novels is Ciudad Rebelde.

He was the first Cuban Revolutionary Government Ambassador to Portugal, and from 1961 he was the Cuban Ambassador to the Holy See, where he was the dean of the diplomatic corps.  He died in Rome, Italy.

References

External links
 Librairie Compagnie bio 
 Digital Granma International article 

1903 births
1975 deaths
People from Avilés (comarca)
Cuban people of Spanish descent
Ambassadors of Cuba to Portugal
Ambassadors of Cuba to the Holy See
Cuban communists